The South Shore Championship was a golf tournament for professional women golfers on the LPGA Futures Tour, the LPGA Tour's developmental tour. The event was  played in 2011 at the White Hawk Country Club in the Crown Point, Indiana area.

The tournament was a 54-hole event, as are most LPGA Futures Tour tournaments, and included pre-tournament pro-am opportunities, in which local amateur golfers can play with the professional golfers from the Tour as a benefit for local charities. The benefiting charity from the South Shore Championship was Lake County United Way.

Winners

*Tournament shortened to 36 holes because of rain.

Tournament records

External links
LPGA Futures Tour official site

Former Symetra Tour events
Golf in Indiana
2011 establishments in Indiana
2011 disestablishments in Indiana